Legend of the Fist: The Return of Chen Zhen is a 2010 Hong Kong martial arts superhero film directed by Andrew Lau, who produced with Gordon Chan, who also wrote the screenplay with Cheung Chi-shing, Philip Lui and Frankie Tam. The film stars Donnie Yen as Chen Zhen, a role made famous by Bruce Lee in the 1972 film Fist of Fury. The film is a sequel to the 1994 film Fist of Legend, which starred Jet Li as Chen Zhen. Principal photography for Legend of the Fist: The Return of Chen Zhen began in November 2009 and ended in early February 2010; shooting took place in Shanghai, China. The film was shown out of competition during the opening night of the 67th Venice International Film Festival, and 2010 Toronto International Film Festival. The film was released in Chinese theatres on 21 September 2010 and two days later in Hong Kong on 23 September 2010.

Plot
The movie is set mainly in China before the Second Sino-Japanese War. Chen, who had faked his death has joined a group of Chinese men who help the Allies fight the Germans in France during World War I. He returns to China after the war and takes on the identity of Qi Tianyuan, his friend who was killed in action.

Back in Shanghai, Chen joins an underground resistance movement to stop the Empire of Japan from invading China. He befriends Liu Yutian, the owner of a nightclub frequented by foreign dignitaries, and becomes attracted to Kiki, a nightclub singer who is actually a Japanese spy. One night, Chen discovers that the Japanese are planning to assassinate General Zeng, the son of a northern warlord, and push the blame to General Zhuo, a rival warlord. Zeng's death will spark off a civil war between the two warlords and aid the subsequent Japanese invasion. Chen disguises himself as a masked superhero and defeats the assassins and saves Zeng. With the operation failed, Tokyo sends a name list of anti-Japanese activists to Colonel Chikaraishi Takeshi, the leader of the Japanese spy agency in Shanghai, ordering him to kill the people on the list. Chikaraishi leaks out the list, causing panic among the populace, and pays a visit to the nightclub.

Chikaraishi is aware of Chen's true identity and challenges Chen to save the people on the list. Chen and Chikaraishi engage in a race of time to save and assassinate the activists respectively. Some are killed while others manage to escape from Shanghai. Eventually, Chikaraishi's younger brother, Sasaki, leads a team of assassins to murder the editor of the Shanghai Times. Chen kills Sasaki but fails to save the editor in time. In the meantime, Chen figures out that Kiki is a spy and warns her to leave. Chikaraishi starts distrusting Kiki and forces her to kill General Zeng's girlfriend, one of her close friends. The blame is pushed to General Zhuo and the angered General Zeng attacks Zhuo with support from Japanese forces. One night, the Japanese ambush Chen on the street, knock him unconscious and bring him to their headquarters to torture him.

Concurrently, Chen's friends stage a raid on the Japanese headquarters and cause serious damage with explosives before fleeing the scene. The Japanese track down Chen's comrades and murder them in revenge later by lynching them and killing Tienyuan's sister. Chen is thrown out of a car in front of the nightclub and remains in coma for days while he recovers from his injuries. With the Japanese invasion underway and General Zhuo killed in action with his forces in full retreat, there seems to be nothing that the resistance movement can do to prevent the Japanese from occupying Shanghai. Chikaraishi challenges Chen to fight him, and kills Kiki after she shows up. In anger, Chen defeats many Japanese combatants all at once, after which he faces Chikaraishi in a one-on-one bout and wins. Chikaraishi is replaced with another officer while Chen dons his superhero costume and continues to help the resistance movement oppose the invaders.

Cast
 Donnie Yen as Chen Zhen, the protagonist of the film.
 Shu Qi as Kiki / Fang Qing / Captain Yamaguchi Yumi (Nihongo: 陸軍大尉 山口由美, Rikugun-Tai-i Yamaguchi Yumi), a Japanese spy.
 Anthony Wong as Liu Yutian, the owner of the nightclub Casablanca.
 Huang Bo as Inspector Huang Haolong, a police officer.
 Kohata Ryu as Colonel Chikaraishi Takeshi (Nihongo: 陸軍大佐 力石武, Rikugun-Taisa Rikiishi Takeshi), the antagonist of the film.
 Akira as Chikaraishi Sasaki (Nihongo: 力石佐々木, Rikiishi Sasaki),  Colonel Chikaraishi's younger brother.
 Yasuaki Kurata as Chikaraishi Tsuyoshi (Nihongo: 力石剛, Rikiishi Tsuyoshi),    Colonel Chikaraishi's father, the Hongkou dojo master who was defeated and killed by Chen Zhen years ago.
 Zhou Yang as Qi Zhishan, Qi Tianyuan's sister.
 Huo Siyan as Weiwei, General Zeng's girlfriend.
 Shawn Yue as General Zeng, a northern warlord whom Chen Zhen saves from assassins.
 Ma Yue as General Zhuo, General Zeng's rival.
 Ma Su as General Zhuo's wife
 Karl Dominik as Vincent, a police officer.
 Chen Jiajia as Huang Yun, a Japanese spy working at the Casablanca.
 Zhang Songwen as Wenzai, the editor of the Shanghai Times.
 Lü Xiaolin as Qiuting, a student protester.

Development
Legend of the Fist: The Return of Chen Zhen is a continuation of the 1994 film Fist of Legend, with Donnie Yen taking over the role of Chen Zhen from Jet Li. Yen also previously played Chen Zhen in Fist of Fury, a 1995 television series adapted from the 1972 film of the same title which starred Bruce Lee as Chen Zhen.

In February 2007, Gordon Chan announced plans to make a follow-up feature film to the 1994 film Fist of Legend. Chan, who was also the writer and director of Fist of Legend, announced that Donnie Yen would replace Jet Li as Chen Zhen in the film.

Production
The film was directed by Andrew Lau, who also co-produced the film and served as a cinematographer alongside his frequent partner Ng Man-ching; Gordon Chan co-wrote and co-produced the film; John Chong served as an executive producer. The film was a co-production between Hong Kong film distributor Media Asia Films, Lau's production company Basic Pictures, and Chinese film producer Enlight Pictures.

On 15 November 2009, Gordon Chan promised the film would not be another remake of Fist of Fury. He also said that in Fist of Legend, Chen Zhen is in his 20s, while in this film Chen would be in his 30s.

Casting
On 29 October 2009, Anthony Wong was announced to be a part of the supporting cast, prior to principal photography, the supporting cast members for the film was announced. Zhou Yang and Shu Qi will play two women competitively vying for Chen Zhen's affection; Huang Bo will play an underdog fighter; Anthony Wong plays a local crime boss.

Filming
Principal photography for Legend of the Fist: The Return of Chen Zhen began on 15 November 2009, following a press conference attended by the cast and crew; filming took place in Shanghai. and concluded in early February.

Action choreography
The fight scenes were choreographed by Donnie Yen. For this film, Yen mentioned that he included nunchaku and the screaming elements as a tribute to Bruce Lee, who played Chen Zhen in the 1972 film Fist of Fury. Furthermore, he incorporated many mixed martial arts (MMA) elements in the film, coupled with the utilisation of Wing Chun. MMA is an interdisciplinary form of fighting utilising elements of Brazilian Jiu-Jitsu, judo, karate, boxing, kickboxing & wrestling, which are evidently in the film.

Yen also stated that the concept behind Bruce Lee's Jeet Kune Do is similar to that of MMA, hence the incorporation of many forms of martial arts is a necessity in this film.

Release
Legend of the Fist: The Return of Chen Zhen was released theatrically in Hong Kong on 23 September 2010. It was further announced that the film will be released to theatres in the United States in its original, uncut international version by Variance Films on 22 April 2011. Thus, a total of 10 minutes of non-fighting scenes will be included.

Box office
The film grossed ¥65 million and ranked first in the box office during the first week of its theatrical run in China. Despite so, its total gross rose to only ¥136 million a month later. Donnie Yen was unhappy with the film distributors because many scenes were removed (about a total of 10 minutes of non-fighting scenes), and he commented on his Sina Weibo that the film's overall gross would not exceed ¥200 million. However, producers Andrew Lau and Gordon Chan think that the film will still express what they want and gross well in other countries.

Reception
Legend of the Fist: The Return of Chen Zhen has been praised for its action scenes and Donnie Yen's performance, and received mostly mixed reviews.

As per negative reviews, Total Film gave the film two stars out of five, stating that the film "only comes alive when showcasing Yen's flamboyant fight choreography, glimpsed far too seldom – the longeurs in between the snappy scraps are sloppily written, and the clumsy Chinese nationalism is tedious." The Guardian gave the film two stars out of five finding the plot to be confusing. The Hollywood Reporter gave the film a mixed review referring to the film as "a popcorn movie of epic proportions" and that "one expects more from producer Gordon Chan and director Andrew Lau". On Rotten Tomatoes, the film received  "rotten" rating based on  reviews.

Other reviews commented that the film is not about Chen Zhen, but a Hollywood-style superhero film; a combination of 007, Spider-Man, and Batman. Director Andrew Lau responded that a Hollywood-style superhero film is what people want to see, and he thinks that a 6:4 ratio of Hollywood style to traditional style is just right for the film.

See also

Donnie Yen filmography
Hong Kong films of 2010
Fist of Legend
Fist of Fury
Chen Zhen

References

External links
 
 
 
 

2010 films
2010 martial arts films
2010s superhero films
2010s Cantonese-language films
Basic Pictures films
Chinese martial arts films
Chinese superhero films
Films directed by Andrew Lau
Films set in France
Films set in 1917
Films set in Shanghai
Films set in 1925
Hong Kong martial arts films
Hong Kong superhero films
Japan in non-Japanese culture
Jeet Kune Do films
Kung fu films
Media Asia films
Second Sino-Japanese War films
Variance Films films
World War I films set in the European theatre
2010s Hong Kong films